Ashchurch Rural is a civil parish in Tewkesbury Borough in Gloucestershire, England. It includes the settlements of Ashchurch, Walton Cardiff, Aston Cross, Aston on Carrant, Pamington and Natton.  The parish was created on 1 April 2008 from the former civil parish of Ashchurch and part of the former civil parish of Walton Cardiff.

References

External links

Ashchurch Rural Parish Council
Aston [-on-Carrant], Pamington & Natton in the Domesday Book

Civil parishes in Gloucestershire
Borough of Tewkesbury